Operation Atalanta, formally European Union Naval Force (EU NAVFOR) Somalia, is a current counter-piracy military operation at sea off the Horn of Africa and in the Western Indian Ocean, that is the first naval operation conducted by the European Union (EU). The operational headquarters is currently located at the Spanish Operation Headquarters (ESOHQ) at Naval Station Rota (NAVSTA Rota) in Spain, having moved from London as a result of the British withdrawal from the EU.

It is part of a larger global action by the EU to prevent and combat acts of piracy in the Indian Ocean, and it is the first EU naval operation to be launched. It cooperates with the multinational Combined Task Force 151 of the US-led Combined Maritime Forces (CMF) and NATO's anti-piracy Operation Ocean Shield.

The mission was launched in December 2008 with a focus on protecting Somalia-bound vessels and shipments belonging to the WFP and AMISOM, as well as select other vulnerable shipments. In addition, Operation Atalanta monitors fishing activity on the regional seaboard. In 2012, the scope of the mission expanded to include Somali coastal territories and internal waters so as to co-ordinate counter-piracy operations with Somalia's Transitional Federal Government (TFG) and regional administrations. On 16 July 2012, the EU also mandated the EUCAP Nestor mission to build up the maritime capacity of regional navies.

In July 2018, the Council of the European Union extended the Mandate of Operation ATALANTA until December 2020.

January the 1st, the Council Decision (CFSP) 2020/2188  of 22 December 2020 that extended again the mandate of the EU NAVFOR Somalia Operation ATALANTA for another two years was implemented.

Overview
Under EU Council Joint Action 851, which is based on various UN resolutions, Operation ATALANTA:
 Protects vessels of the World Food Programme (WFP), African Union Mission in Somalia (AMISOM) and other vulnerable shipping;
 Deters and disrupts piracy and armed robbery at sea;
 Monitors fishing activities off the coast of Somalia;
 Supports other EU missions and international organisations working to strengthen maritime security and capacity in the region.

The Operation's mission evolved over its first ten years. On 8 December 2009, monitoring of fishing activity was formally added to the mandate. Although it took time for the data to lead to direct legal consequences, DG MARE has subsequently used the information EU NAVFOR provides to build sanctions cases against foreign governments. On 17 December 2018 the EU Council granted permission for EU NAVFOR to share data on forms of maritime crime other than piracy with INTERPOL and EUROPOL.

Council Decision (CFSP) 2020/2188 extended the mandate of the EU NAVFOR Somalia Op. ATALANTA for another two years until the end of 2022.
With this latest mandate extension, besides operation's core tasks, there were included some non-executive secondary tasks:
 Support other EU missions and instruments in Somalia upon request.
 Contribute to the monitoring of fishing activity off the coast of Somalia.
 Contribute to the monitoring of narcotics drugs trafficking, weapons trafficking, illegal, unreported and unregulated fishing and charcoal illicit trade off the coast of Somalia.
 Contribute to the EU integrated approach to Somalia and the relevant activities of the international community.
 Support the promotion of the overall regional maritime security architecture, the relevant programmes implemented by the commission and to reinforce the already developed links with the Regional Maritime Information Fusion Cnetre (RMIFC) in Madagascar and the Regional Operational Coordination Centre.
Finally, the new mandate includes the possibility to activate as an executive secondary task, the contribution to the disruption of drug and weapons trafficking inside EU NAVFOR Somalia area of operations.

Located in Brest (FR) and depending on the Headquarters of Operation ATALANTA, is the Maritime Security Centre – Horn of Africa (MSCHOA), an initiative established by the European Union Naval Force, with close co-operation from industry. The MSCHOA centre provides 24-hour manned monitoring of vessels transiting through the Gulf of Aden, whilst the provision of an interactive website enables the centre to communicate the latest anti-piracy guidance to industry and for Shipping Companies and operators to register their movements through the region.

Participation in EU NAVFOR goes beyond EU member states. Norway was the first non-EU country to contribute to the Operation, with a warship in 2009. Thereafter Croatia (pre-Accession), Montenegro, Serbia, Ukraine and the Republic of Korea have provided staff officers either to the Operational Headquarters (OHQ) or to the Force Headquarters (FHQ). Ukraine contributed a warship early in 2014, and New Zealand contributed an MPRA asset (a Lockheed P-3 Orion of No. 5 Squadron RNZAF) later the same year. The Republic of Korea formally joined EU NAVFOR on 27 February 2017.

Around 700 personnel are involved in ATALANTA, with the size of the force typically varying between 1–6 surface combat vessels and 1–3 Maritime Patrol Aircraft. In 2019, the budget was around €5 million for the common costs of the mandate.
For 2021 the budget will be 4.4 million Euros for the common costs of the mandate.

Judicial international co-operation to end impunity
Piracy has to be understood as organised criminal activity occurring at sea. It is organised on land, with kidnapping crews and ships for ransom as the business model. Prosecution of piracy suspects is a key component of the overall fight against piracy. The EU NAVFOR seeks, where possible, a legal finish. Transfers of suspect pirates for trial to competent authorities remain necessary to put an end to impunity in the Indian Ocean.

The EU is assisting the United Nations Development Programme (UNDP) and the United Nations Office for Drugs and Crime (UNODC) in their work to establish sufficient conditions to allow fair and efficient piracy trials in Somalia. The EU is the largest contributor to the UNODC counter-piracy programme. In the short term, transfers for trial from EU NAVFOR ships remain necessary to put an end to impunity in the Indian Ocean.

Prelude
The Transitional Federal Government of Somalia wrote to the President of the United Nations Security Council asking for international help to fight piracy and armed robbery against ships off the coast of Somalia. In June 2008, the Council unanimously passed Resolution 1816 authorising nations that have the agreement of the Transitional Federal Government to enter Somali territorial waters to deal with pirates. The measure, which was sponsored by France, the United States and Panama, was to last six months. France initially wanted the resolution to include other regions with pirate problems, such as West Africa, but were opposed by Vietnam, Libya and China, who wanted the sovereignty infringement limited to Somalia.

Highlights
Operation Atalanta formally commenced on 8 December 2008 in accordance with the mandate laid down in UNSC Resolution 1814.

On 1 January 2009, eight Somali suspects were captured by the French frigate Premier-Maître L'Her as they attempted to seize a Panamanian-registered cargo ship (MV S Venus) some 50 nautical miles south of Yemen.

On 14 April 2009, the French frigate Nivôse, attached to Operation Atalanta, captured 11 suspected pirates, together with their mother ship and two skiffs, in an EU NAVFOR focused operation carried out in the Indian Ocean. The French ship responded to the distress message by the 21,000 tonne Liberia flagged MV Safmarine Asia which came under small arms and RPG attack from two skiffs operating from a pirate mother ship. The warship deployed its helicopter, which quickly arrived on the scene, to deter the hijacking and shadow the mother vessel until the frigate arrived.

On 26 May 2009, the EU Naval Task Force vessel HSwMS Malmö responded to a distress call from the European cargo vessel  and apprehended seven suspected pirates.

From 5 to 7 March 2010, forces from France, Italy, Luxembourg, Spain and Sweden were in action; the French frigate Nivôse (F 732) secured its "biggest seizure" to-date in a vital shipping lane off the coast of Somalia, with 35 pirates arrested and four mother ships seized in three days.

In May 2010, there were a number of incidents in the area. The Russian destroyer Marshal Shaposhnikov freed the 106,474-ton MV Moscow University, which was about 350 miles east of Socotra, transporting crude oil from Sudan to China. Two days later, however, Russia's Defense Ministry said it had proved impossible to establish the pirates' citizenship or to establish legal grounds for prosecuting, therefore the pirates were returned to their boat and set free. In another incident, a Swedish aircraft attached to the EU Naval Force, the French warship La Fayette and the Dutch warship  collaborated in the spotting and capturing of a pirate action group composed of a whaler and two skiffs, about 400 miles northwest of the Seychelles Islands. Reports on these incidents, citing other news reports, concluded that pirates were holding almost 20 vessels and about 300 crew members.

In September 2011, Marines from the Spanish landing platform dock Galicia rescued the French citizen Evelyn Colombo. She had been kidnapped from the French yacht Tribal Kat, and her husband Christian killed while trying to protect her.

In November 2012, Marines from the Spanish corvette Infanta Cristina liberated 21 Pakistani sailors from the trawler Al Talal, who had been kidnapped, detaining 9 pirates.

On 15 May 2012, EU naval forces conducted their first raid on pirate bases on the Somalia mainland as part of the operation, saying they 'destroyed several boats'. The forces were transported by helicopter to the pirate bases near the port of Harardhere. The attack was carried out overnight, and, according to the European forces, no local residents were hurt during the mission.

On 24 October 2014, the first non-European Third State asset integrated into EU NAVFOR, when New Zealand provided a P-3 Orion of 5 Squadron RNZAF.

On 27 October 2016, following an appeal from the President of Puntland direct to the Operational Headquarters, EU NAVFOR warship Relámpago diverted to the Puntland coast in the first EU NAVFOR show of force against violent extremist organisations when the coastal town of Qandala was overrun by ISIS sympathisers.

In November 2017, a six crew member motor whaler acting as mother ship, and a skiff attacked a 52,000 tonne container ship and a fishing vessel in the Southern Somali Basin. The suspected pirates were apprehended by the Italian Marines from ITS Virginio Fasan after their vessels were located using Fasan's SH-90 helicopter, following initial searches by the Spanish Maritime Patrol Aircraft Cisne.

On 27 Oct 2018, EU NAVFOR destroyed a whaler that took part on a boarding attempt to the MV KSL SYDNEY on 16 Oct 18 to prevent it being used for pirate acts.

In April 2019, several piracy incidents took place involving different shipping vessels and a Yemeni dhow where captured off the coast of Somalia. On 21 April, EU NAVFOR dispatched its Maritime Patrol Aircraft (MPRAs) and conducted a search in the area, resulting in identifying the mothership dhow.  On 23 April, in collaboration with its MPRAs, EU NAVFOR's flagship ESPS NAVARRA successfully intercepted and boarded the captured dhow vessel. EU NAVFOR apprehended five suspected pirates, and the 23 hostages aboard the hijacked FV Al Azham were released unharmed. This is the latest piracy incident reported by EU NAVFOR Somalia Op. ATALANTA.

Deployed units

Vessels
The following vessels are part of EU NAVFOR's current fleet in Operation Atalanta as of 15 February 2022. Operation Atalanta has the task force designator Task Force 465.

Refer to EUNAVFOR.EU website for current list of deployed units.

Aircraft
As of May 2021 the following aircraft are currently deployed with the European Union Naval Force – Operation Atalanta.

Vessels and aircraft in former rotation periods
The following vessels have, among others, been committed to the Operation .

  Louise-Marie (F931), Belgium
  Leopold I (F930), Belgium
  Brandenburg (F215), (Germany)
   Mecklenburg-Vorpommern (F218), Germany
   Schleswig-Holstein (F216), (Germany)
   Bayern (F217), Germany
  Rheinland-Pfalz (F209), (Germany)
   Köln (F211), (Germany)
   Niedersachsen (F208), (Germany)
   Lübeck (F214), (Germany)
  Hamburg (F220)
  Rhön (A1443), (Germany)
  Spessart (A1442), (Germany)
  Berlin (A1411), Germany
  , Netherlands
  , Netherlands
  , Netherlands
  , Netherlands
  , Netherlands
  , Netherlands
 Replenishment oiler , Netherlands
 Replenishment oiler , Netherlands
 Rotterdam class amphibious transport dock , Netherlands
  , Netherlands
 Bergamini-class frigate Carabiniere (F 593), Italy
 Bergamini-class frigate Carlo Margottini (F 592)
  Maestrale (F 570), Italy
  Grecale (F 571), Italy
  Libeccio (F 572), Italy
  Scirocco (F 573), Italy
  Euro (F 575), Italy
  Espero (F 576), Italy
  Zeffiro (F 577), Italy
  Comandante Borsini (P 491), Italy
  Comandante Bettica (P 492), Italy
  San Giorgio (L 9892), Italy
  San Giusto (L 9894), Italy
  Andrea Doria (D 553), Italy
 AGF/AOR Etna (A 5326), Italy
 helicopter cruiser Jeanne d'Arc (R97), France
  Tonnerre (L9014), France
  Jean de Vienne (D643), France
  Georges Leygues (D640), France
  Aconit (F713), France
  Guépratte (F714), France
  La Fayette (F710), France
  Surcouf (F711), France
  De Grasse (D612)
  Floréal (F730), France
  Nivôse (F732), France
  Jean Bart (D615), France
  Enseigne de vaisseau Jacoubet (F794), France
  Marne (A630), France
  Siroco (L9012), France
 Lockheed P-3 Orion P-3K2 Orion, New Zealand
  NRP Vasco da Gama (F330)
  NRP Álvares Cabral (F331)
 Lockheed P-3 Orion P-3C Papa, Portugal
  Santa Maria (F81), Spain
  Victoria (F82), Spain
  Numancia (F83), Spain
  Navarra (F85), Spain
  Canarias (F86), Spain
  Reina Sofía (F84), Spain
  Blas de Lezo (F103), Spain
  Mendez Nuñez (F104), Spain
  Infanta Elena (P76), Spain
  Infanta Cristina (P77), Spain
  Cazadora (P78), Spain
  Vencedora (P79), Spain
 Galicia (L51), Spain
 Castilla (L52), Spain
 Replenishment oiler , Spain
 Meteoro-class offshore patrol boat Meteoro (P41)
 Meteoro-class offshore patrol boat Relámpago (P43), Spain
 Meteoro-class offshore patrol boat Tornado (P44), Spain
 Lockheed P-3 Orion P-3M Orion, Spain
 Type 23 frigate , United Kingdom
 Type 23 frigate , United Kingdom
  RFA Lyme Bay (L3007), United Kingdom
  HS Salamis (F455) Greece
  HS Psara (F454) Greece
  HS Elli (F450), Greece
  HS Adrias (F459), Greece
  HSwMS Stockholm (K11), Sweden
  HSwMS Malmö (K12), Sweden
 Akademik Shuleykin-class auxiliary vessel HSwMS Trossö (A264), Sweden
 Off-shore Patrol Vessel HMS Carlskrona (P04), Sweden
  HNoMS Fridtjof Nansen (F310), Norway – (Non EU member contribution)
 Pohjanmaa class minelayer FNS Pohjanmaa, Finland
  Regele Ferdinand (221), Romania
  Hetman Sahaydachniy (U130), Ukraine
 Offshore patrol vessel ARC 7 de Agosto (PZE-47) – (non-EU member collaboration), Colombia

See also
List of military and civilian missions of the European Union
Maritime Security Patrol Area
Combined Task Force 151
Operation Ocean Shield
Piracy in Somalia
List of ships attacked by Somali pirates

References

External links

 European Union Naval Force Somalia – Operation Atalanta
 Maritime Security Centre – Horn of Africa
 European Union External Action Service
 European Union Naval Force Twitter Page
 Sebastian Bruns: ATALANTA at three – a success or a failure? Strategic Insights by Risk Intelligence No. 36, 2008, S. 8–12